Arnold Veimer (20 June 1903 – 3 March 1977) was a Soviet Estonian politician and economist.

Biography 
Veimer joined the Communist Party of Estonia (EKP) in 1922, and was given a lifetime sentence of forced labour in the trial of the 149 in 1924. In May 1938, he was released in a general amnesty.

After the Soviet occupation of Estonia in the summer of 1940, Veimer was elected a deputy to and chairman of the so-called People's Parliament in Estonia, which later became the Supreme Soviet of the Estonian SSR. In 1941 Veimer was elected to the Central Committee of the Communist Party of Estonia, now renamed the Communist Party of Estonia (bolsheviks) (EK(b)P). The same year, he graduated from the department of economics at the University of Tartu. 

In 1944–1951, Veimer was Chairman of the Council of Ministers (until 1946 Chairman of the Council of People's Commissars) of the Estonian SSR. After being removed from this position, he was appointed director of the Institute of Economics and Law of the Academy of Sciences of the Estonian SSR. After the death of Joseph Stalin, Veimer returned to political work: in 1957–1965 he was Chairman of the Sovnarkhoz (Council of National Economy) of the Estonian SSR, and in 1965–1968 he was Deputy Chairman of the Council of Ministers of the Estonian SSR. He later served as President of the Academy of Sciences of the Estonian SSR in 1968–1973.

References

1903 births
1977 deaths
People from Jõelähtme Parish
People from Kreis Harrien
Communist Party of Estonia politicians
Heads of government of the Estonian Soviet Socialist Republic
Members of the Supreme Soviet of the Estonian Soviet Socialist Republic, 1940–1947
Members of the Supreme Soviet of the Estonian Soviet Socialist Republic, 1947–1951
Members of the Supreme Soviet of the Estonian Soviet Socialist Republic, 1951–1955
First convocation members of the Supreme Soviet of the Soviet Union
Second convocation members of the Supreme Soviet of the Soviet Union
Third convocation members of the Supreme Soviet of the Soviet Union
Fifth convocation members of the Supreme Soviet of the Soviet Union
Sixth convocation members of the Supreme Soviet of the Soviet Union
Estonian prisoners and detainees
20th-century Estonian economists
Soviet economists
University of Tartu alumni
Heroes of Socialist Labour
Recipients of the Order of Lenin
Recipients of the Order of the Red Banner of Labour

Burials at Metsakalmistu